Stafford Lake may refer to:

Lake Stafford in Florida
Stafford Lake County Park in Marin County, California